Observatory Street is a street in Oxford, England. It links at the eastern end Woodstock Road (opposite Bevington Road and St Anne's College and nearly opposite St Antony's College) in central North Oxford and at the western end Walton Street and the Jericho area of Oxford, England. 

The street borders the north side of Green Templeton College, one of the Oxford University colleges, which has some student accommodation in the street. The street is named after the Radcliffe Observatory (completed in 1794), which now forms a centrepiece for the College. To the north is St Bernard's Road.

Observatory Street, developed from 1834, mainly consists of terraced houses directly on the street, many characterized by brightly painted stuccoed fronts in a variety of colours, especially on the south side of the street, which is very late Georgian. Once built as small dwellings for poorer inhabitants of Oxford, often workers on early railway and canal construction, the houses now command high prices because of the central location of the street, within easy walking distance of the city centre and close to the Oxford University Humanities and Mathematics site on the Radcliffe Observatory Quarter.

Belsyre Court is located on the north side at the east end of Observatory Street, Woodstock Road, and the south side at the east end of St Bernard's Road. It was designed by Ernest R. Barrow and built in 1936. Belsyre Court was the first large block of flats in Oxford. An Inland Revenue office was located here from 1936 until the early 1990s.

Adelaide Street branches off Observatory Street partway along and runs parallel to the north at the western end, also connecting with Walton Street.

References

1834 establishments in England
Odonyms referring to a building
Streets in Oxford
Green Templeton College, Oxford